The  is a private arboretum located at 2566 Koshigaya, Koshigaya, Saitama, Japan. Its curator, Tadahiko Aritaki, traveled and collected plants throughout Asia.

References 
 BGCI entry
 Plant Exploration for Longwood Gardens

Arboreta in Japan
Botanical gardens in Japan
Gardens in Saitama Prefecture
Koshigaya, Saitama